Pistilli is an Italian-language surname. Notable people with this surname include:

Gene Pistilli, American songwriter
Luigi Pistilli, Italian actor
Matthew Pistilli,  Canadian professional ice hockey player
 Marie Pistilli and Pasquale (Pat) Pistilli , originators of the Design Automation Conference
Vicente Pistilli, Paraguayan academic

Italian-language surnames